WFI may mean:

 Wikimedia Foundation Inc., the parent organization of Wikipedia
 WFI Acquisition Inc, which bought a chain of convenience stores from Tops Markets LLC
 Wallis and Futuna has UNDP country code WFI
 Westerfield railway station has National Rail code WFI
 Fianarantsoa Airport has IATA code WFI
 WFIL radio originally had call sign WFI
 WFI – Ingolstadt School of Management, a leading German business school
 WFI – Water for Injection
 Women for Independence